Julius Lambot (14 August 1866 Nehatu Parish, Harrien County – 11 August 1941 Iru Parish, Harju County) was an Estonian politician. He was a member of II Riigikogu, representing the National Liberal Party. He was a member of the Riigikogu since 6 February 1926. He replaced Ernst Constantin Weberman.

References

1866 births
1941 deaths
People from Jõelähtme Parish
People from Kreis Harrien
National Liberal Party (Estonia) politicians
Members of the Riigikogu, 1923–1926
Estonian people executed by the Soviet Union